Nanyang Concert Band, formerly known as the Nanyang Military Band, began as a 30-member brass band in 1969. Over the years, it has grown into a band with more than 100 members. They perform regularly at public events, school functions such as the Nanyang Family Concert, Nanyang Festival of Arts and its annual Appassionata concerts.

Activities

Under the leadership of Samantha Chong Shoo Mei, the band clinched three consecutive Gold awards at the Singapore Youth Festival Central Judging of Indoor Bands in 2003, 2005 and 2007. More recently, the band received a Silver award at the SYF Central Judging in 2009. The band also clinched the coveted Grooviest Band Award at the Band Fiesta held at the Botanic Gardens in 2004. Last year, the band has been invited again to perform at the Band Fiesta and also at the Limelight series at the Esplanade.

Besides regular band practices, the band has always received opportunities to extend its musical knowledge through various activities such as band exchanges, as well as master-classes conducted by renowned music directors. In May 2007, the band was invited to be the demonstration band for the SYF 2007 band master-class conducted by Professor Grant Okamura, a Professor at University of Hawaii where he assumes the position of Director of Bands. To further its exposure, the band has recently embarked on a band exchange trip to Tokyo, Japan, home of the world's greatest bands. Two of the band members have recently been selected to represent Singapore at the International Music camp held in Minot, North Dakota, USA.

References 

Musical groups established in 1969
Singaporean concert bands